Marcelo Rangel Rosa (born 17 May 1988) is a Brazilian professional footballer who plays as a goalkeeper for Goiás.

Professional career
Rangel made his professional debut with Cianorte in a 1-0 Campeonato Paranaense win over Cruzeiro RS on 17 July 2011.

Honours
Goiás
Campeonato Goiano: 2017, 2018

References

External links
 
 Marcelo Rangel at playmakerstats.com (English version of ogol.com.br)

1988 births
Living people
Sportspeople from Paraná (state)
Brazilian footballers
Association football goalkeepers
Cianorte Futebol Clube players
Operário Ferroviário Esporte Clube players
Londrina Esporte Clube players
Goiás Esporte Clube players
Campeonato Brasileiro Série A players
Campeonato Brasileiro Série B players
Campeonato Brasileiro Série C players
Campeonato Brasileiro Série D players